is a Japanese manga series written and illustrated by Jun Sakura. It was serialized in Shogakukan's Shōnen Sunday S from May 2012 to September 2013, then moved to Weekly Shōnen Sunday, where it was serialized from October 2013 to May 2019. Its chapters were collected in sixteen tankōbon volumes.

Plot
A transfer student at her new high school, Chihiro Watanuki is helped out by a student while finding a place to park her bicycle. After her class introduction concludes, she finds out that her seat is right next to the boy who helped her earlier that day. Her classmates inform her that he is Yuji Yugami, the ace of the Baseball Club. However, they also advise her to stay away from him, as he is known to be a bonafide weirdo and his actions are incomprehensible to most people. Unconvinced, she attempts to interact with him, quickly realizing that he is nothing but a pain to talk to and that the rumors were indeed true.

Shortly afterward, Chihiro gets entangled in a sticky situation with the third-years, but Yuji once again comes to her rescue, albeit for his own self-righteous reasons. Convinced that there is more to him than meets the eye, she is determined to treat him unbiasedly and to live a normal high school life surrounded by friends.

Characters

The Ace of the Kamihoshi baseball team, he is the first person Chihiro meets when she transfers into Kamihoshi. He tends to do things at his own pace, always marching to the beat of his own drum. He is notoriously known as a troublesome weirdo amongst not only his baseball club teammates, but also his classmates and this causes him to be isolated by his peers. However, being alone doesn't faze Yuji at all, and he claims he doesn't need friends. After all the third-year member retired at the end of summer, he is given the new captain role of Kamihoshi baseball team even though Yuji himself is uninterested.

A transfer student at Kamihoshi who wants to make friends quickly. The first person she meets when she transfers in is Yuji, whom she ends up sitting next to in class. Despite being warned by classmates to not associate with him, Chihiro ends up talking to Yuji often. Although she considers him troublesome to deal with at times, Yuji is also often the one who helps her out when she's troubled.

A first year regular on the baseball club and Yuji's catcher, who used to play on the same local youth baseball team as Yuji. Despite being a year younger than Yuji, he has spent the longest time with him and the one who knows Yuji's attitude the most.

A friend of Chihiro who used to be in love with Yuji until she know his real personality. She is a very meticulous person. She is someone who wants to do a task in a perfect way. Whenever something didn't go according to her plans. She is either keeping silent or getting enraged about it. Though Rio no longer has any feelings for Yuji, she still continues to support the Baseball club and is willing to help the club whenever it gets troubled especially for an upcoming tournament. 

Yuji's little sister. She is a first year middle school student, she often makes snide remarks regarding her older brother.

A second year student and the baseball club's ace of the Amagi baseball team. He has known Yuji since elementary school and considers him a rival, but the rivalry is completely one-sided on Masaki's part.

The baseball club's manager. She is Yuji and Chihiro's classmate. Wakana considers Yuji troublesome and tries her best to ignore him.

Yuji and Chihiro's classmate, along with being part of Kuzumi's group of friends. She hates Yuji with a passion and disliked Chihiro for associating with him and getting close to Kuzumi, She later developed a crush towards Yuji.

Manga
Yugami-kun ni wa Tomodachi ga Inai is written and illustrated by Jun Sakura. The series ran in Shogakukan's Shōnen Sunday S from May 25, 2012 to September 25, 2013, then was subsequently transferred to Weekly Shōnen Sunday, where it ran from October 30, 2013 to May 22, 2019. The series was collected into sixteen tankōbon volumes published by Shogakukan, released from November 16, 2012 to July 18, 2019. Two anime commercials for the manga, animated by A-1 Pictures, were released on November 26, 2013 and September 18, 2014. A drama CD was released along with the sixth volume of the manga.

Volume list

Reception 
Yugami-kun ni wa Tomodachi ga Inai ranked #13 on the "Nationwide Bookstore Employees' Recommended Comics" by the Honya Club website in 2014.

References

Further reading

External links
Official website at Web Sunday 
 

Comedy anime and manga
School life in anime and manga
Shogakukan manga
Shōnen manga